HMS Taurus was a Second World War T-class submarine, built by Vickers Armstrong, Barrow.

Career

As HMS Taurus
The submarine was laid down on 30 September 1941, and launched on 27 June 1942. Taurus was commissioned on 3 November 1942 with the pennant number P339. She served in the Mediterranean and the Pacific Far East during the Second World War.  Whilst serving in the Mediterranean, she sank the small French merchant Clairette, the Spanish merchant Bartolo, the Italian merchant Derna, the French tug Ghrib and two barges, the Portuguese Santa Irene , the small Italian tanker Alcione C., the Italian sailing vessel Luigi, twenty eight Greek sailing vessels, and the small Greek ship Romano.  She also damaged a further two sailing ships and the Greek merchant Konstantinos Louloudis. It was during this period off the Greek coast she had the unusual distinction of engaging a Bulgarian cavalry unit while bombarding a small port.

She was transferred to the Far East to operate against the Japanese, where she sank the Japanese submarine , two Japanese tugboats and a barge and the Japanese salvage vessel Hokuan I-Go.  She also laid a number of mines, which damaged the Japanese submarine  and sank the Japanese transport ship Kasumi Maru. 
 
Having survived the war, Taurus was transferred to the Royal Netherlands Navy on 4 June 1948 and commissioned into service the same day. She was renamed Dolfijn.

As HNLMS Dolfijn

Dolfijn had a relatively quiet career, making a number of cruises before being decommissioned on 7 November 1953 and transferred back to the Royal Navy.

As HMS Taurus again

Dolfijn was recommissioned into the Royal Navy on 8 December 1953 and her name returned to the original HMS Taurus.  She served for another seven years before being sold to be broken up for scrap in April 1960.

References

Publications

External links
 IWM Interview with Mervyn Wingfield, who commanded HMS Taurus from 1942 to 1944

 

British T-class submarines of the Royal Navy
Ships built in Barrow-in-Furness
1942 ships
World War II submarines of the United Kingdom
Zwaardvisch-class submarines
Cold War submarines of the United Kingdom